The Cathedral Church of Saint Andrew, also commonly known as St. Andrew's Cathedral, is a cathedral of the Episcopal Church in the United States located in the State of Hawaii.  Originally the seat of the Anglican Church of Hawaii, it is now the home of the bishop of the Episcopal Diocese of Hawaii. It is affiliated with St. Andrew's Schools, which consists of the main girls' K-12 school, the coeducational Queen Emma Preschool and a boys' preparatory school (elementary).

History
Kamehameha IV and Queen Emma, his queen consort, were devout members of the Church of England led by their good friend Queen Victoria. At their request, Thomas Nettleship Staley was appointed bishop in 1862. Inspired to build a place of worship in the Anglican tradition, Kamehameha IV commissioned the construction of what would later become the Cathedral of Saint Andrew.  However, the king died on the feast day of Saint Andrew in 1863 before ground-breaking. Kamehameha V, the king's brother, took over the project and laid the cornerstone in honor of his predecessor on March 5, 1867.  The cathedral was designed by the London architects William Slater and R. H. Carpenter, and the building process was overseen by their chief assistant Benjamin Ingelow.

The Cathedral of Saint Andrew was built in the French Gothic architectural style, shipped in several pre-fabricated pieces from England.  The western facade has a window of hand-blown stained glass that reaches from the floor to the eaves, depicting the European explorers that visited the Hawaiian islands.

There are only three other cathedrals in the Hawaiian Islands — Cathedral Basilica of Our Lady of Peace, Saints Constantine and Helen Greek Orthodox Cathedral of the Pacific of the Greek Orthodox Archdiocese of America and the Co-Cathedral of Saint Theresa of the Child Jesus of the Roman Catholic Diocese of Honolulu.

It is located on Queen Emma Street, between Beretania Street and Queen Emma Square.
It was added to the National Register of Historic Places listings in Oahu on July 2, 1973 as site 73000663.

Bells
The Mackintosh Tower, completed in 1912, contains a set of eight bells hung for change ringing, and is the westernmost such tower in the United States and the world. The current bells, which predate the cathedral, came from St. Alkmund's Church, Shrewsbury, United Kingdom. They were cast in 1812 by John Briant (1748-1829), a bellfounder based in Hertford. They went unrung for many years due to that church's structural issues, and in 1972, facing redundancy, the bells were put up for sale. In 1990, the bells were removed from St Alkmund's Church to John Taylor & Co, who refurbished and retuned the bells to F♯. The bells, at the request of the donor, were also inscribed with the names of the Hawaiian monarchs. They were installed in 1991.

Gallery

See also

List of the Episcopal cathedrals of the United States
List of cathedrals in the United States

References

External links

 Anglicanism in Hawai'i
 Cathedral Church of Saint Andrew
 Saint Andrew's Priory School

Andrew, Honolulu
Churches completed in 1958
20th-century Episcopal church buildings
Churches in Honolulu
Cathedrals in Hawaii
Gothic Revival church buildings in Hawaii
Churches on the National Register of Historic Places in Hawaii
Episcopal church buildings in Hawaii
Historic district contributing properties in Hawaii
1867 establishments in Hawaii
National Register of Historic Places in Honolulu